The Reflections of a Nonpolitical Man is a non-fiction work by German author Thomas Mann published in 1918. Unlike his brother Heinrich, Thomas Mann supported the German war effort during World War I. The book, which runs to almost six hundred pages, defends the authoritarianism and "culture" of Germany against the "civilization" of the West. It served to justify and distinguish his conservative political stance from that of his more liberally oriented brother.

Writing and publication history

Background 

Romain Rolland and other French authors criticised this literary support for Germany and in particular the support of the German invasion of neutral Belgium. Rolland from time to time also criticised Mann personally for his pro-war stance and substantiated this reproach in the essay , which was later published as part of the essay collection . In this essay he criticised Thomas Mann's militarism and ill-advised fanaticism. This reproach was a major impulse for Mann to begin writing the Reflections; he specifically answered Rolland in the chapter called "Against Justice and Truth". From the summer of 1915 onwards, he started to arrange his material to support Germany in intellectual and cultural terms.  

The impulse for authoring the book was intensified by an essay on Émile Zola written by his brother Heinrich Mann, which appeared in René Schickele's pacifist journal Die Weißen Blätter in autumn 1915. This essay contained swipes at his unnamed brother and painted him as a patriotic propagandist. According to the scholar , this essay caused Thomas Mann to expand his material from a mere essay into a whole book.

Writing process 
The writing ended with the drafting of the prologue in February 1918, which gives commentary on the overall layout of the book.

Publication history and translations 
The book was published shortly before the armistice in October 1918. It was not translated into English during Thomas Mann's lifetime. According to Tobias Boes, the non-translation of the work during his lifetime was intentional on Mann's part due to chauvinistic content of the book which could have led to his abandonment by the American public. The first English translation by Walter D. Morris under the title Reflections of a Nonpolitical Man was published in 1983 by Frederick Unger Publishing Company. This translation was republished in 2021 as a NYRB Classic with an introduction by Mark Lilla.

Motifs 
The Reflections of a Nonpolitical Man have been recognised as a wartime treatise. Thomas Mann saw his work as "intellectual military service" in the confrontation between German "culture" and French and British "civilisation". 

Christopher Beha argues that the central motif of the Reflections is the dichotomy between "civilization" and "culture". Civilization, according to Thomas Mann, "involves reason, enlightenment, moderation, moral education, skepticism". Culture represents the opposite for him, namely "the sublimation of the demonic". He assaults Civilization’s Literary Men, because they treat "culture as a means, rather than an end in itself."

Content

Prologue [] 
The "Prologue" is a reflection on the work written in previous three years. Mann provides the main reasons for the writing of this long treatise and introduces its main themes:

Chapter 1: The Protest [] 
The first chapter of the book is noticeably short. In it, Mann uses Fyodor Dostoevsky to explain that Germany as the country has always protested against the Roman Catholic and Western world.

Chapter 2: The Unliterary Country [] 
In the brief second chapter, the "Roman" Western world is described as being literary, while Germany is introduced as the "unliterary country".

Chapter 3: Civilisation's Literary Man [] 
In the third chapter, the "Francophile" progressive authors (his brother Heinrich being one of them) are introduced as Civilisation's Literary Men. The ideal of Civilisation's Literary Men is democratisation, which Mann considers to be antithetical to Germany's inner nature.

Chapter 4: Soul-Searching [] 
In the chapter titled "Soul-Searching", Mann explains the significance of the "triumvirate" of Arthur Schopenhauer, Richard Wagner and Friedrich Nietzsche as the inspirators for his thinking.

Chapter 5: Burgherly Nature [] 
In "Burgherly Nature",  Mann contrasts the solidity of burgherly individualist ethics with the bottomlessness of ethicists.

Chapter 6: "Against Justice and Truth" [] 
The chapter "Against Justice and Truth" has a paraphrased quotation from Heinrich Mann's Zola essay as its title. In it, Mann defends his early wartime essays against his brother Heinrich and Romain Rolland.

Chapter 7: Politics [] 
The chapter on politics is by far the longest. Here Mann defines aestheticism as freedom from politics. He then turns to deliberations inspired by Emil Hammacher and Paul de Lagarde about Bismarck, the state, conservatism, suffrage, democracy, politicised art and Germany in 1914.

Chapter 8: On Virtue [] 
In his chapter on virtue,  Mann opposes the virtue of Civilisation's Literary Men which relies on buzzwords and contrasts it with the pessimistic ethos of Joseph von Eichendorff's Memoirs of a Good-for-Nothing, Paul Claudel's  and Hans Pfitzner's opera Palestrina.

Chapter 9: Some Comments on Humanity [] 
In his comments on humanity, Mann develops a humanity of suffering and service.

Chapter 10: On belief [] 
Fyodor Dostoevsky inspires the chapter "On belief". According to Mann, true faith is not faith in any principles, words and ideas such as freedom, equality, democracy, civilisation and progress, but faith in God, meaning, at the same time, faith in love, life and art.

Chapter 11: On Aestheticism [] 
The last two chapters of the work deal with aestheticism. In "On Aestheticism", Mann explains that political artistry is false because he considers it to be half, intellectual, intentional and artificial. The chapter ends with a notable critique of expressionism and satire.

Chapter 12: Irony and Radicalism [] 
In the closing chapter on "Irony and Radicalism", Mann marks his work as being inspired by irony. The works of Civilisation's Literary Men are in contrast characterised as works of radicalism. The scholar  explains that Mann sees irony as conservative self-denial of the spirit in favour of life, which is supposed to stand against the anti-life radicalism and activism of the spirit.

Legacy and modern reception 
Thomas Mann never fully denounced the views espoused in the Reflections, even after the 1929 Nobel laureate had become one of the main opponents of Nazism among German expatriates in the United States. Instead, he viewed the work as a crucial step on his journey as a writer.

Christopher Beha argues that the Reflections are "a strange, frequently off-putting book, a 500-page assault on democracy, enlightenment and reason", but sees value in the idea that "we do damage to life's most important elements when we use them instrumentally, for political ends". By exposing this he sees the book as posing "a real challenge to our moment, obsessed as it is with the political responsibility of the artist."

References

Citations

Sources

Further reading

External links 
 

Conservative Revolutionary movement
German-language literature
20th-century literature
Books by Thomas Mann